Elizabeth Toussaint (born September 25, 1962) is an American former actress and model. She is best known for her television performances.

Life and career
Before television roles, Toussaint worked as a model, and appeared in the 1984 music video for Bon Jovi's song "She Don't Know Me", Bob Seger's 1986 song "Like a Rock", and in the 1987 music video for SAGA's song "Only Time Will Tell". Additionally she appeared in the 1987 music video for the song "Big Mistake" by Peter Cetera.

From 1988 to 1989, she was a recurring cast member in the CBS primetime soap opera Dallas as Tracey Lawton, and from 1996 to 1997 in The WB primetime soap opera Savannah. Toussaint also appeared in Cheers, Star Trek: The Next Generation (as Ishara Yar in the episode "Legacy", 1990), Melrose Place, Matlock, Babylon 5 (episode "Revelations", 1994) and Martial Law. In July 2006, she appeared on The Young and the Restless playing Hope Wilson, in her final screen role to date.

Personal life
Toussaint is married to actor Jack Coleman. The couple have a daughter, born in 1999.  Her parents are Leona and Maynard Toussaint, and she is the elder sister of writer David Toussaint.

Filmography

References

External links
 

1962 births
American film actresses
American television actresses
Living people
Place of birth missing (living people)
American soap opera actresses
American female models
20th-century American actresses
21st-century American actresses
Actresses from California
Female models from California
People from Pleasant Hill, California